Ruslan Fanilyevich German (born 6 December 1983) is a former Russian professional football player.

Club career
He made his Russian Football National League debut for FC Gazovik-Gazprom Izhevsk on 19 April 2004 in a game against FC Lisma-Mordovia Saransk.

External links
 

1983 births
Living people
Russian footballers
Association football forwards
FC Izhevsk players